Dovletgeldi Shirgeldiyevich Mirsultanov (born 29 May 1995) is a Turkmen footballer who plays for Turkmen club FC Energetik. He was part of the Turkmenistan national team from 2018.

Club career

International career 
Played for Turkmenistan U22 football team at 2018 AFC U-23 Championship qualification.

Annasähedow made his senior national team debut on 27 March 2018, in an 2019 AFC Asian Cup qualification – Third Round match against Bahrain national football team.

References

External links
 
 

1995 births
Living people
People from Mary, Turkmenistan
Turkmenistan footballers
Turkmenistan international footballers
Association football defenders
FC Ahal players
FC Altyn Asyr players